David K. Oakley (April 27, 1945 – July 2, 2006) was an American professional golfer whose greatest success came on the European Seniors Tour.

Oakley was born in New York, but grew up in Panama City, Florida. He got started in golf by his mother, who thought a nine-hole course near their home would make a fine babysitter for Oakley and his brother. Oakley was the older brother of American professional golfer Pete Oakley.

Oakley attended the University of Florida in Gainesville, Florida, where he was a walk-on member of coach Buster Bishop's Florida Gators men's golf team from 1965 to 1967. As a Gator golfer, he was a member of teams that won Southeastern Conference (SEC) championships in 1965 and 1967. He graduated from the University of Florida with a bachelor's degree in business administration in 1967.

Oakley turned pro in 1970 and toured Europe, Asia, Canada and the United States before hanging up his clubs in 1976 to concentrate on a business career unrelated to golf. He spent ten years as a hotel liquidator and nine as a furniture store manager and regained his amateur status. He returned to professional golf in 1996 and played on various senior circuits.

Oakley died in Orlando, Florida, from prostate cancer at the age of 61. He was survived by his wife Doris and sons James and Christopher. At the time of his death, he was fifth on the European Seniors Tour career money list.

Professional wins (4)

European Senior Tour wins (4)

European Senior Tour playoff record (1–0)

See also

Florida Gators
List of University of Florida alumni

References

External links

American male golfers
Florida Gators men's golfers
European Senior Tour golfers
Golfers from New York (state)
Golfers from Orlando, Florida
People from Panama City, Florida
Deaths from prostate cancer
Deaths from cancer in Florida
1945 births
2006 deaths